Richard Townley (died 1711) was a privy counsellor.

Richard Townley or Richard Towneley or Richard de Towneley may also refer to:
Richard de Towneley (MP) (1323–1381), MP for Lancashire
Richard Towneley (1387–1455), Man-at-arms at the battle of Agincourt
Sir Richard Towneley (1445–1482), soldier for future Richard III of England
Richard Towneley (1629–1707), English mathematician and astronomer
Richard Greaves Townley (1786–1855), English Whig politician

See also
Towneley family, many of whom were called Richard